Steve Vickers is the name of:
Steve Vickers (ice hockey) (born 1951), Canadian former ice hockey player
Steve Vickers (footballer) (born 1967), English former central defender
Steve Vickers (computer scientist) (born 1953), lecturer and ROM file engineer of the ZX Spectrum